Thomas Richmond (January 18, 1950 – July 29, 2022) was an American cinematographer who worked in the film industry since the mid-1980s. His first major feature film as cinematographer was Stand and Deliver (1988), and by the time he shot for A Midnight Clear (1992), he had settled into working with different directors with ease. Richmond described his experience, "All my films look different because they're not my visions; they're my reflections of the directors' visions." In 1998, he said he was most proud of his work on Little Odessa (1994), for which he was nominated an Independent Spirit Award for Best Cinematography. For Right at Your Door (2006), he won the Excellence in Cinematography Award (Dramatic) at the 2006 Sundance Film Festival.

Richmond earned an undergraduate degree in photography at Harvard University and then went to graduate film school at UCLA. He also went to the American Film Institute's AFI Conservatory and graduated in 1979. He became a member of the American Society of Cinematographers (ASC) in 2012, and was also a member of the Academy of Motion Picture Arts and Sciences (AMPAS) and the International Cinematographers Guild (ICG). He taught cinematography at the New York University Tisch School of the Arts and the Brooklyn College Feirstein Graduate School of Cinema.

Richmond died in New York City on July 29, 2022, at the age of 72.

Credits
Credits are feature films unless indicated otherwise (e.g., TV movie, TV miniseries).

References

Further reading

External links

Tom Richmond, Creative Master Series – Cinematography at NAB Show
Craft Truck Interview Through the Lens – Part 1 S01EP14 and 

1950 births
2022 deaths
American cinematographers
AFI Conservatory alumni
Brooklyn College faculty
Harvard University alumni
People from Bronxville, New York
Tisch School of the Arts faculty
UCLA Film School alumni